William Mott may refer to:

 William Mott (British Columbia politician) (1894–1961), Canadian electrician and member of Parliament from British Columbia
 William A. Mott (1864–1911), Canadian lawyer and politician from New Brunswick
 William I. Mott (born 1953), American horse trainer
 William Penn Mott Jr. (1902–1992), director of the United States National Park Service
 Bill Mott (soldier) (born 1957), most senior NCO in the British Army